Gorgabad (also romanized as Gorgābād; also known as Gorgābād-e Pā’īn) is a village in Aliabad Rural District, in the Central District of Anbarabad County, Kerman Province, Iran. At the 2006 census, its population was 69, in 17 families.

References 

Populated places in Anbarabad County